Clean Sweep is a maze game, released for the Vectrex home game console. It was written by Richard Moszkowski.

Gameplay
Clean Sweep is a maze game in which the bank president has to recover stolen money using a vacuum cleaner and return it to the deposit box while avoiding the thieves. Some portions of the game feature a dark maze where the player can see only the loot.

Reception
TV Gamer noted that this was the first of its kind for either arcade or home consoles, and "A fairly successful attempt at a maze game using Vector graphics".

Reviews
TeleMatch (German)
Joystick (Swedish)

References

Vectrex games